Sisahaniya is a village and Village Development Committee  in Bara District in the Narayani Zone of south-eastern Nepal. At the time of the 1991 Nepal census it had a population of 2,154 persons living in 343 individual households.

References

External links
UN map of the municipalities of Bara District

Populated places in Bara District